The Kirchgasse is a shopping street in central Wiesbaden, Germany, and with roughly 11,000 people passing through every hour, it is one of the busiest shopping streets in Germany.
The Kirchgasse is a designated pedestrian zone and spans about 500 meters from the Rheinstraße on the southern end to the Langgasse on the northern end. In 2007 a study has named the Kirchgasse the second most expensive street for retail property in Hesse, after the Zeil in Frankfurt am Main.

See also 
 List of leading shopping streets and districts by city

References 

Pedestrian streets in Germany
Streets in Wiesbaden
Shopping districts and streets in Germany
Tourist attractions in Wiesbaden